Tomato purée is a thick liquid made by cooking and straining tomatoes. The difference between tomato paste, tomato purée, and tomato sauce is consistency; tomato puree has a thicker consistency and a deeper flavour than sauce.

Differences
The definitions of tomato purée vary from country to country. In the U.S., tomato purée is a processed food product, usually consisting of only tomatoes, but can also be found in the seasoned form. It differs from tomato sauce or tomato paste in consistency and content; tomato purée generally lacks the additives common to a complete tomato sauce and does not have the thickness of paste.

The standard consistency of tomato puree is more than or equal to 7% but less than 24% natural total soluble solids.

Passata di pomodoro
Passata di pomodoro is an uncooked tomato purée, strained of seeds and skins. Passata is from the Italian verb passare, "to go through".

See also

 List of tomato dishes

References

External links
 Passata recipes and information at the BBC's Food pages

tomato products